The United States Army Command and General Staff College (CGSC or, obsolete, USACGSC) at Fort Leavenworth, Kansas, is a graduate school for United States Army and sister service officers, interagency representatives, and international military officers.  The college was established in 1881 by William Tecumseh Sherman as the School of Application for Infantry and Cavalry (later simply the Infantry and Cavalry School), a training school for infantry and cavalry officers. In 1907 it changed its title to the School of the Line. The curriculum expanded throughout World War I, World War II, the Korean War, and the Vietnam War and continues to adapt to include lessons learned from current conflicts.

In addition to the main campus at Fort Leavenworth, the college has satellite campuses at Fort Belvoir, Virginia; Fort Lee, Virginia; Fort Gordon, Georgia; and Redstone Arsenal, Alabama. The college also maintains a distance-learning modality for some of its instruction.

Mission statement
The United States Army Command and General Staff College (CGSC) educates and develops leaders for full spectrum joint, interagency and multinational operations; acts as lead agent for the Army's leader development program; and advances the art and science of the profession of arms in support of Army operational requirements.

Schools

The college consists of four schools:  the Command and General Staff School, the School of Advanced Military Studies, the School for Command Preparation, and the School of Advanced Leadership and Tactics.
 Command and General Staff School (CGSS) provides Intermediate Level Education (ILE) for United States Army and sister service officers, interagency representatives, and international military officers. ILE is a ten-month graduate-level program; the curriculum includes instruction on leadership philosophy, military history, and the military planning and decision-making processes. There is one ILE class per year; starting in August and ending in June. About 1,200 US military and international officers make up the class.  In addition to the ILE curriculum, a graduate masters program exists for students who may qualify to complete a thesis-level research paper and receive a Master of Military Arts and Sciences (M.M.A.S.) degree from the Command and General Staff College.  The program is accredited by the Higher Learning Commission, the accrediting body for collegiate institutions in the midwestern United States.  ILE students are normally mid-career field-grade officers preparing for battalion command or staff positions at the division, brigade, or battalion level.  In addition to CGSS at Fort Leavenworth, the school operates satellite campuses at Fort Belvoir, Virginia; Fort Lee, Virginia; Fort Gordon, Georgia; and Redstone Arsenal, Alabama. Students at the satellite campuses complete the ILE Common Core, a condensed ninety-day program without the M.M.A.S. option, in lieu of the traditional ten-month program.
 School of Advanced Military Studies (SAMS) provides post-ILE instruction on complex military issues at the strategic and operational levels. Students who complete the curriculum receive a Master of Military Arts and Sciences degree and are then assigned as high-level military planners.
 School for Command Preparation (SCP) provides instruction for colonels, lieutenant colonels, and command sergeants major who have been selected for brigade or battalion command.  Courses are normally three to four weeks and focus on special topics unique to assumption of command at the levels indicated.
 School of Advanced Leadership and Tactics (SALT) provides officer continuing education towards developing the Scholar-Warrior-Leader from first lieutenant to selection for major. The result is mastery of branch-specific technical and tactical skills, staff processes in battalions and brigades, direct leadership and command competencies, and initial broadening opportunities.
During World War I, the CGSC at Ft. Leavenworth was closed, from 1916 until 1920.  Most of the school staff was sent to Langres, France, to open and conduct the Army General Staff College, which operated from November 1917 to December 1918.  This compressed-curriculum school was needed to provide command and staff officers for the exponentially growing number of Army units; divisions, regiments, brigades, and battalions.

Master of Military Art and Science degree

The Command and General Staff College confers a Master of Military Art and Science (MMAS) professional degree to graduates of the School of Advanced Military Studies as well as graduates of the Command and General Staff School who complete a thesis-level research paper.  The degree is accredited by the Higher Learning Commission for collegiate institutions in the midwestern United States.

Notable people

Notable alumni

 Creighton Abrams (1949)
 Clara Leach Adams-Ender (1976)
 Henry H. Arnold (1929)
 Lloyd J. Austin III
 Charles L. Bolte (1932)
 Omar Bradley (1929)
 Simon Bolivar Buckner Jr. (1928)
 Richard E. Cavazos (1960)
 Mark W. Clark (1935)
 J. Lawton Collins (1933)
 William E. DePuy (1946)
 Jacob L. Devers (1925)
 Roger H.C. Donlon (1971)
 Robert L. Eichelberger (1929)
 Dwight D. Eisenhower (1925–26)

 James M. Gavin (1942)
 Andrew Goodpaster (1943)
 Stuart Heintzelman (1916)
 Lewis Blaine Hershey (1933)
 Courtney Hodges (1925)
 William M. Hoge (1928)
 Michelle J. Howard (1998)
 Clarence R. Huebner (1925)
 Harold Keith Johnson (1949)
 Robert Kingston (1960)
 John C. H. Lee (1918)
 Kirk Lippold (1994)
 Douglas MacArthur (1912)
 Raymond S. McLain (1938)

 George Marshall (1907)
 Troy H. Middleton (1924)
 Aubrey Newman (1943)
 Lunsford E. Oliver (1928)
 John McAuley Palmer (1910)
 George S. Patton Jr. (1924)
 David Petraeus (1983)
 Colin Powell (1968)
 Elwood Richard Quesada (1937)
 Matthew Ridgway (1935)
 Bernard W. Rogers (1954)
 Richard J. Seitz (1950)
 Peter J. Schoomaker (1982)
 H. Norman Schwarzkopf (1969)

 Walter Bedell Smith (1935)
 Carl Andrew Spaatz (1936)
 Donn A. Starry (1960)
 Joseph Warren Stilwell (1926)
 Gordon R. Sullivan (1969)
 Loree K. Sutton
 Maxwell D. Taylor (1935)
 Maxwell R. Thurman (1967)
 Hoyt Vandenberg (1936)
 James Van Fleet (1918)
 Jonathan Mayhew Wainwright IV (1931)
 Albert Coady Wedemeyer (1936)

Notable foreign alumni
The college reports that 7,000 international students representing 155 countries have attended CGSC since 1894 and that more than 50 percent of CGSC International Military Student (IMS) graduates attain the rank of general.
 General Carlos Prats, Commander-in-Chief of the Army, Interior and Defense Minister, Vice President of the Republic of Chile. 
 Minister of State General Mohammed F Abo Sak of Saudi Arabia
 Prime Minister and General Kriangsak Chamanan of Thailand
 General Alfredo M. Santos of the Philippines
 Lieutenant General Rafael Ileto (former Secretary of the Department of National Defense) of the Philippines
 Prime Minister and General Tran Thien Khiem of South Vietnam
 General Do Cao Tri of South Vietnam
 General Hau Pei-tsun of the Republic of China (Taiwan)
 President Paul Kagame of Rwanda
 General Katumba Wamala of Uganda
 Brigadier General Muhoozi Kainerugaba son of Ugandan president
 General Yahya Khan of Pakistan
 General Muhammad Zia-ul-Haq of Pakistan
 General Rahimuddin Khan of Pakistan
 General Jehangir Karamat of Pakistan
 General Ashfaq Parvez Kayani of Pakistan
 General Eiji Kimizuka of Japan
 General Hisham Jaber of Lebanon
 General Krishnaswamy Sundarji of Indian Army
 Brigadier-General Lee Hsien Loong of Singapore, 3rd Prime Minister of Singapore
 General Dieudonné Kayembe Mbandakulu of the Democratic Republic of the Congo
 President Gaafar Nimeiry of Sudan
 Lt. Colonel Anastasio Somoza Portocarrero of the Guardia Nacional de Nicaragua
 General Nguyễn Hợp Đoàn of South Vietnam
 General Nguyễn Khánh of South Vietnam
 General Phạm Văn Đồng of South Vietnam
 Ministry/Chief of Army General Staff and General Ahmad Yani of Indonesia
 President and General Susilo Bambang Yudhoyono of Indonesia
 General Veljko Kadijević of Yugoslavia
 General Antonio Domingo Bussi of Argentina
 General Moeen U Ahmed of Bangladesh
 General Amer Khammash of Jordan
 General Arne Dagfin Dahl of Norway
 General Gustav Hägglund of Finland
 General Avigdor Kahalani of Israel
 Lieutenant General David Tevzadze of Georgia
 Major General Vladimer Chachibaia of Georgia
 Colonel Nikoloz Janjgava of Georgia
 General Moeen U Ahmed of Bangladesh
 Général d'armée René Imbot, Chief of Staff of the French Army, General Director of DGSE, France
 King Hamad bin Isa Al Khalifa of Bahrain
 General Abdulkadir Sheikh Dini of Somalia
 Colonel Ahmed Mohammed Ali of Egypt
 Lieutenant General Sean McCann of Ireland
 General Mahesh Senanayake of Sri Lanka
 General Bipin Rawat of India, Chief of Defence Staff
 Lieutenant General Mykhailo Zabrodskyi of Ukraine

Notable faculty and deputy commandants
 Robert Arter (Deputy Commandant 1977–79)
 Richard E. Cavazos (faculty 1970–71)
 Roger H.C. Donlon (1978–81)
 Frederick M. Franks Jr. (Deputy commandant 1985–87)
 Glenn K. Otis Deputy Chief of Staff 1976–78
 Colin Powell Deputy Commanding General of the Combined Arms Combat Development Activity (1982–83)
 Gordon R. Sullivan Deputy Commandant 1987–88
 Adna R. Chaffee Jr. 1919–20
 Clarence R. Huebner (1929–33)
 Walter Krueger (1901–12)
 Lucian Truscott 1934–40

Commandants

Since 1976, the commandant of the college has been a lieutenant general. David Petraeus was the commandant between 2005 and 2007, immediately before going to command the Multi-National Force – Iraq.

Photo gallery

See also
 Battle command
 Air Command and Staff College
 Indonesian Army Command and General Staff College

References

External links
 
 Command and General Staff College, Combined Arms Research Library
 Command and General Staff College, Combined Arms Research Library Digital Library

1881 establishments in the United States
1881 in Kansas
 
Staff colleges of the United States
Universities and colleges in Kansas
Education in Leavenworth County, Kansas
Military in Kansas
Fort Leavenworth
United States Army schools
Buildings and structures in Leavenworth County, Kansas
Universities and colleges accredited by the Higher Learning Commission